Judge Hughes (1944–2013) was an American football player and coach. Judge Hughes may also refer to:

James Hughes (representative) (1823–1873), judge of the United States Court of Claims
Lynn Hughes (born 1941), judge of the United States District Court for the Southern District of Texas
Robert William Hughes (1821–1901), judge of the United States District Court for the Eastern District of Virginia
Sarah T. Hughes (1896–1985), judge who served on the United States District Court for the Northern District of Texas
Séamus Hughes (1952–2022), Irish District Court judge
Ted Hughes (judge) (1927–2020), Canadian judge of the Saskatchewan Court of Queen's Bench
Todd M. Hughes (born 1966), judge of the United States Court of Appeals for the Federal Circuit

See also
Justice Hughes (disambiguation)